Reynaldo Dante (March 13, 1912 – February 10, 1985) was a Filipino actor.

Filmography

 1938: Carmelita  [Parlatone]
 1938: Celia at Balagtas  [Excelsior]
 1938: Dalagang Luksa  [Parlatone]
 1938: Dolores  [Parlatone]
 1939: Magkaisang Landas  [Parlatone]
 1939: Tatlong Pagkabirhen  [X'Otic]
 1939: Langit sa Karimlan  [Parlatone]
 1939: Ang Kaban ng Tipan  [X'Otic]
 1940: Lihim ng Lumang Simbahan  [X'Otic]
 1940: Dugo ng Alipin  [Cervantina]
 1940: Patawad  (Lvn)
 1941: Angelita [Lvn]
 1947: Hagibis  [Premiere]
 1948: Ang Anghel sa Lupa  [Premiere]
 1949: Bakit Ako Luluha?  [Premiere]
 1949: Alamat ng Perlas na Itim  [Lawin]
 1949: Naglahong Tala  [Supreme]
 1949: Suwail  [Premiere]
 1950: Tubig na Hinugasan  [Quezon Memorial]
 1950: Kamay  ni Satanas  [Premiere]
 1951: Labis na Pagtitipid  [Premiere]
 1951: Sisa  [Premiere]
 1953: Malapit sa Diyos  [Lebran]
 1954: Guwapo  [MV]
 1956: Heneral Paua [Larry Santiago]
 1957: Kandilang Bakal  [Champion]

External links

1912 births
Filipino male film actors
1985 deaths